Katie (24 August 1988 – 1992) and Eilish Holton (born 24 August 1988), were Irish conjoined twins born to Mary and Liam Holton of Donadea, Co Kildare. They were joined at the pelvis and the legs and were the subject of several newspaper articles and later a two-part television documentary. In 1992, the twins were surgically separated. Katie Holton did not recover from the operation, dying four days later. Eilish Holton was reportedly the inspiration for the name of Billie Eilish, according to the singer's parents.

References

Conjoined twins
1988 births
1992 deaths
Living people
People from County Kildare
Irish twins